Enteromius melanotaenia is a species of ray-finned fish in the genus Enteromius, it has only been recorded from its type locality the River Via in the St. Paul's river basin of Liberia.

References 
 

Enteromius
Taxa named by Melanie Stiassny
Fish described in 1991